Jean-Pierre Garuet-Lempirou (born 15 June 1953) is a former French international rugby union player. He played as a prop for FC Lourdes.

He earned his first cap with the French national team on 13 November 1983 against Australia at Clermont-Ferrand. Since then he was established as one of the elite props in world rugby. He was called for the 1987 Rugby World Cup, where France was runners-up to New Zealand.

References

1953 births
Living people
French rugby union players
France international rugby union players
Rugby union props
People from Lourdes
FC Lourdes players
Sportspeople from Hautes-Pyrénées